George B. Ely was an American football, basketball and baseball coach. He was the head football coach at Kutztown University of Pennsylvania for one season in 1905 before the school disbanded the sport until 1923.

Ely served for head baseball coach from 1906 to 1908 and the head men's basketball coach for one season in 1906 at Kutztown.

After leaving Kutztown, Ely served as the baseball coach for one year at Shippensburg University of Pennsylvania in 1910, leading the team to an 11–3 record.

Head coaching record

Football

References

External links
 Kutztown Hall of Fame profile

Year of birth missing
Year of death missing
Kutztown Golden Bears athletic directors
Kutztown Golden Bears baseball coaches
Kutztown Golden Bears men's basketball coaches
Kutztown Golden Bears football coaches
Shippensburg Red Raiders baseball coaches